Newport (Shropshire) station was a railway station serving Newport in Shropshire. that was situated on the Stafford to Shrewsbury Line via Wellington.

History
In 1847 the London and North Western Railway leased the line between Stafford and Wellington from the Shropshire Union Canal and Railway Company, however the line was not finished until 1849. Newport was an important station along the stretch between Wellington and Stafford as it had a large cattle market and was one of the largest towns in the area.

In 1922 the line was absorbed by the London, Midland and Scottish Railway, with the passenger service withdrawn in 1964 as a result of the Beeching Axe and the line closed completely in 1967. The track was lifted soon afterwards.

It has been reported by the Shropshire Star  that Winston Churchill spent a night in the sidings at Newport in 1942

Restoration
Due to Newport's proximity to the new town of Telford and the cities of Wolverhampton, Birmingham and Stoke-on-Trent, Newport is seen as a potential commuter town, but the absence of a station is a loss to the town.

The line is in the top 36 'Lines that should reopen' listing published by the Campaign for Better Transport.

References

Further reading

Newport, Shropshire
Disused railway stations in Shropshire
Former London and North Western Railway stations
Beeching closures in England
Railway stations in Great Britain opened in 1849
Railway stations in Great Britain closed in 1964